The Order of the House of Orange (Dutch: Huisorde van Oranje), sometimes referred to as the House Order of Orange, is a dynastic order of the House of Orange-Nassau, the royal family of the Netherlands similar to the Royal Victorian Order in the United Kingdom. The order was instituted by Queen Wilhelmina of the Netherlands on 19 March 1905 and is not subject to ministerial responsibility or influence, but is awarded at the discretion of the Dutch monarch alone.

History

1905 – 1969
In 1905, Queen Wilhelmina felt the need for a House Order because the Order of the Oak Crown of the Grand Duchy of Luxembourg, used by her father and grandfather to reward Dutch subjects, was no longer available to her, as succession to the throne of Luxembourg was directed by the House treaty of the House of Nassau in a way comparable to the Salic Law within its constitution in 1890.

The Order of the House of Orange had a very complex nomenclature, with 18 different classes and medals:

  Grand Cross
  Grand Officer
  Commander
  Officer
  Knight
Knight 2nd. Class (since 1908)
  The Golden Medal for Art and Science (equal in rank to a Grand Officer and very rare)
  The Golden Medal for Initiative and Ingenuity (since 1917, equal in rank to a Grand Officer and very rare)
  The Silver Medal for Art and Science (equal in rank to an Officer and rare)
  The Silver Medal for Initiative and Ingenuity (since 1917, equal in rank to an Officer and rare)
Dame of Honour
Golden Cross of Merit
Silver Cross of Merit
  Golden Medal of Honour
  Silver Medal of Honour
  Bronze Medal of Honour
Medal for saving lives from deadly peril (since 1910)
  The Bronze Medal for Art and Science. (equal in rank to a knight and rare)

The number does not indicate a rank within the Order. The Dame of Honour was neither inferior nor superior to another grade; however the highest rank was the Grand Cross. The insignia vary considerably amongst these awards; however, they all share the same orange ribbon, symbolizing the House of Orange.

More than 3200 decorations were conferred between 1905 and 1969, mostly to Court Dignitaries, the Queen's household, and doctors and lawyers who could choose between sending a bill for their services or a decoration in the House Order.

Reorganisation of the order in 1969
By court decree on 30 November 1969, Queen Juliana decided to reorganise the Order to bring it more in line with the ever more egalitarian spirit of the Dutch society. As a result, the order is now divided into four semi-independent groups:

The House Order
The Order for Loyalty and Merit
Honorary medals
The Honorary medal for Arts and Science
The Honorary medal for Initiative and Ingenuity
The Order of the Crown

The House Order today
Since the reorganisation in 1969 the House Order itself has these grades:

 Grand Cross (Grootkruis) - badge may be worn on a sash on the right shoulder, plus an 8-pointed star on the left chest;
  Grand Honorary Cross (Groot erekruis) - wears the badge on a necklet;
  Honorary Cross (Erekruis) - wears the badge on a ribbon on the left chest.

Every subject of the King (or Queen) of the Netherlands, apart from the members of the Royal House (see note), can be awarded the Cross of Honour. Once awarded, the recipient can be promoted to a higher grade of the House Order after three years.

''Note: The Royal House (Koninklijk Huis) is a rather complex definition within Dutch constitutional theory and Dutch law. It consists of the Monarch, his or her consort, former monarchs and their consorts and those members of his family that have a right to succeed him up to the second degree and their consorts. The Government is responsible for the actions and words of the monarch and in a lesser respect the members of the Royal House. The House is not the same as the Royal Family. The Queen's second son decided not to ask for parliamentary approval for his marriage and lost his right to succeed to the throne, his membership of the Royal House and the title Prince of the Netherlands. He did however retain the style and title of Royal Highness, a Prince of Orange-Nassau and a member of the Royal Family.

References

External links
 

1905 establishments in the Netherlands